GMA Life TV is a 24-hour Philippine pay television channel launched in February 2008 by GMA Network.

Programming

Programming consists mostly of shows from GMA Network and GTV as well as previously aired shows, documentaries, cooking shows, travelogues, films and sports events from the Philippines. Most weekend shows are up to date, with the exception of some shows that air on a one-episode delay basis.

History
The channel carries programming from GMA Network and GTV. It was launched on February 16, 2008, in Japan and is available in the Middle East and North Africa through OSN and My-HD.

In June 2008 it was launched in Australia and New Zealand on UBI World TV. It is now also available in the whole United States via Dish Network and DirecTV.

On November 2, 2009, it was launched in Hawaii via Oceanic Time Warner Cable as a video on demand channel.

The channel was launched in Singapore on SingTel in June 2013.

See also
GMA Network
GMA Pinoy TV
GMA News TV International
GTV
Overseas Filipino

References

External links
 DISH Network Filipino Package
 Official Site

International broadcasters
Television networks in the United States
Direct broadcast satellite services
GMA International
Filipino diaspora
Cable television in the United States
International broadcasting
Television channels and stations established in 2008
Filipino-language television stations
2008 establishments in the Philippines
GMA Network (company) channels